Kevin Scheidhauer (born 13 February 1992) is a German former professional footballer who played as a forward.

Career
Scheidhauer joined MSV Duisburg for the 2014–15 season. For the 2016–17 season he moved to Schalke 04 II.

Following an injury to his ankle joint which kept him out of action for 1.5 years, Scheidhauer trained twice a week with German fifth-tier side Lupo Martini Wolfsburg. In November 2017, he went on trial with fourth-tier club Energie Cottbus. A month later, he signed a contract with the club which would run from the 2017–18 winter transfer period until 31 June 2019.

He announced his retirement from playing in October 2020.

Career statistics

1.Includes relegation playoff and Regionalliga promotion playoff.

References

External links

1992 births
Living people
People from Deggendorf (district)
Sportspeople from Lower Bavaria
Association football forwards
German footballers
Footballers from Bavaria
Germany youth international footballers
VfL Wolfsburg II players
VfL Wolfsburg players
VfL Bochum II players
VfL Bochum players
MSV Duisburg players
FC Schalke 04 II players
FC Energie Cottbus players
2. Bundesliga players
3. Liga players
Regionalliga players